Râul Mare Hydro Power Plant is a large power plant on the Râul Mare River, a river situated in Romania.

The hydropower plant was built in the 1980s. The Gura Apelaor Dam was built to be used as a hydrodam.

The power plant generates 650 GWh of electricity per year.

See also

Porţile de Fier I
Porţile de Fier II

External links
Description 

Hydroelectric power stations in Romania
Dams in Romania